Ornarantia velatana is a moth in the family Choreutidae. It was described by Francis Walker in 1863. It is found in Brazil.

References

Choreutidae
Moths described in 1863